Greendale Secondary School (abbreviation: GDLSS; Simplified Chinese: 绿苑中学; Traditional Chinese: 綠苑中學) is a neighbourhood secondary school located in Punggol, in between the Meridian LRT station and Coral Edge LRT station, in the north-eastern part of Singapore. The school was found and started in January 2006 and in 2010, Greendale Secondary School represented the North-East district by hosting the launch site for the YOG torch relay in day 3 of the Singapore leg.

History
Before the school was established, the school compound was a temporary campus for Holy Innocents' High School in 2004.
 
In 2005, principal Mary Koh, together with other teaching staff were transferred to the school to prepare for its opening and in 2006, Greendale Secondary School was operational and took in its first batch of Secondary One students.

In December 2008, Mark Gerard Minjoot took over as Principal while Koh was posted to MOE HQ as Cluster Superintendent/School Division. In 2014, Minjoot was posted to Montfort Secondary School and Amy Ng was appointed as the new principal of the school.

In 2022, Amy Ng was posted to Naval Base Secondary School while Sulaiman Mohmad Yusof was appointed principal of the school.

Principals

Accessibility
The school is located near the Meridian LRT station and is served by the following bus services: 3, 83 and 85 at the bus stop between Blocks 187 and 188 and feeder bus service 386 at the bus stop outside Greendale Primary School.

See also
Ministry of Education
Education in Singapore

References

External links
Official website

Secondary schools in Singapore
Buildings and structures in Punggol
Schools in North-East Region, Singapore